Domestic Airport is a train station located on the Airport Link, serving Terminals 2 and 3 at Sydney Airport, Australia. International Terminal 1 is served by International Airport station. The station is operated by Sydney Trains with T8 Airport & South line services.

History
Domestic Airport station opened on 21 May 2000 when the Airport Link opened from Central to Wolli Creek. Like other stations on the line, Domestic Airport was built and is operated by the Airport Link Company as part of a public–private partnership.

As part of the contract to build the line, an access fee is levied to recover the costs of building the line. Although often perceived as all going to the Airport Link Company, under the revenue sharing agreement, from August 2014 85% of revenues raised by the access fee go to the State Government.

Platforms & services

Transport links
Transdev John Holland operate one route to and from Domestic Airport station:
350: to Bondi Junction station

Transit Systems operate one route via Domestic Airport station:
420: Westfield Burwood to Mascot station

Gallery

References

External links

Sydney Domestic Airport Station at Transport for New South Wales

Airport railway stations in Australia
Easy Access railway stations in Sydney
Railway stations located underground in Sydney
Railway stations in Australia opened in 2000
Sydney Airport
Airport Link, Sydney